is a city located in Aichi Prefecture, Japan. , the city had an estimated population of 118,259 in 51,846 households, and a population density of 2,494 persons per km2.

Geography

Handa is located in northeastern Chita Peninsula in southern Aichi Prefecture, and is bordered by Mikawa Bay to the east.

Climate
The city has a climate characterized by hot and humid summers, and relatively mild winters (Köppen climate classification Cfa).  The average annual temperature in Handa is 15.6 °C. The average annual rainfall is 1632 mm with September as the wettest month. The temperatures are highest on average in August, at around 27.5 °C, and lowest in January, at around 4.5 °C.

Demographics
Per Japanese census data, the population of Handa has increased steadily over the past 70 years.

Neighboring municipalities
Aichi Prefecture
Hekinan
Tokoname
Takahama
Taketoyo
Agui
Higashiura

History

Early modern period
During the Edo period, the area of Handa was part of Owari Domain.

Late modern period
In the post-Meiji restoration establishment of the modern municipalities system on October 1, 1889, the towns of Handa and Kamezaki were founded, as was the town of Narawa the following year.
These three towns merged on October 1, 1937, to form the city of Handa.

Government

Handa has a mayor-council form of government with a directly elected mayor and a unicameral city legislature of 22 members. The city contributes two members to the Aichi Prefectural Assembly.  In terms of national politics, the city is part of Aichi District 8 of the lower house of the Diet of Japan.

External relations

Twin towns – Sister cities

International
Sister cities
Midland（Michigan, United States of America）
since June 5, 1981.
Port Macquarie（New South Wales, Australia）
since April 14, 1990.
Friendship city
Xuzhou（Jiangsu, China）
since May 27, 1993

National
Sister cities
Nanto（Toyama Prefecture Chūbu region)
since April 28, 1997.

Economy

Secondary sector of the economy

Brewing
Handa has a strong historical connection with soy sauce, sake and vinegar brewing, and remains the worldwide headquarters of the Mizkan Vinegar Group.

Manufacturing
During World War II, Nakajima Aircraft Company established an aircraft production plant in Handa. In the post-war period, this was redeveloped into a heavy industrial zone, including a production plant by Dow Chemical. Handa and Midland, Michigan became Sister Cities in 1981, a relationship that continues to this day.

Education

University
Nihon Fukushi University – Handa campus

Schools
Handa has thirteen public elementary schools and five public middle schools operated by the city government, and five public high schools operated by the Aichi Prefectural Board of Education. The prefecture also operates two special education schools for the handicapped.

Transportation

Railways

Conventional lines
 Central Japan Railway Company
Taketoyo Line：-  –  –  –  –
 Meitetsu
Kōwa Line：-  –  –  –  –
 Kinuura Rinkai Railway
Handa Line：-（freight only）

Roads

Expressways
 Chitahantō Road
 Minamichita Road
 Chitaōdan Road

Japan National Routes

Local attractions

Handa Red Brick Building
Mizkan Museum
Niimi Nankichi Memorial Museum
Yakachi River
Jōraku-ji
CLACITY HANDA

Culture

Festival
Okkawamatsuri Festival
Kamesaki Festival

Notable people from Handa
Satoru Akahori, author
Nankichi Niimi, author
Atsushi Harada, actor
Eiji Mitsuoka, mixed martial artist
Hiromi Makihara, professional baseball player
Takaya Ishikawa, professional baseball player
Keiko Lee, jazz singer
Nobuhiro Yamashita, film director

References

External links

  

 
Cities in Aichi Prefecture
Port settlements in Japan
Populated coastal places in Japan